Stanley Winfield "Swede" Vejtasa (27 July 1914 – 23 January 2013) was a United States Navy career officer and World War II flying ace. During the Battle of the Santa Cruz Islands, he was credited with downing seven Japanese aircraft in one mission, becoming an "ace in a day".

Early life
Vejtasa was born at an isolated homestead in Montana on July 27, 1914. He attended Montana State College, before transferring to the University of Montana.

Military career
He joined the Navy in 1937 and became a Naval Aviator on 13 July 1939. Commissioned an ensign in August, he was first assigned to Scouting Squadron Five (VS-5) aboard the aircraft carrier  that same month, flying the Douglas SBD Dauntless.

World War II
After the United States entered World War II, then Lieutenant (junior grade) Vejtasa attacked three Japanese "aircraft tenders or transports", scoring a direct hit on one of them "near Salamaua and Lae, New Guinea", on 10 March 1942, for which he was awarded his first Navy Cross.

During the Battle of the Coral Sea, he and several other dive bomber pilots sank the Japanese light aircraft carrier Shōhō on 7 May 1942. Walter Schindler, the staff gunnery officer and future vice admiral, filmed the day's strike as Vejtasa's rear gunner. The next day, while flying in defense of the U.S. task force, Vejtasa claimed three Mitsubishi A6M Zero fighters shot down, despite flying a much slower but sturdy Dauntless dive bomber. For his actions during the battle, he was awarded his second Navy Cross.

Vejtasa was transferred to fighters, piloting the Grumman F4F Wildcat, and was assigned to the newly formed Fighting Squadron 10, under Lieutenant Commander James H. Flatley, aboard . During the Battle of the Santa Cruz Islands, he was credited with downing seven enemy aircraft in one mission – first two Aichi D3A "Val" dive bombers attacking , then five Nakajima B5N "Kate" torpedo bombers targeting Enterprise – becoming an "ace in a day". (Postwar analysis confirmed two dive bombers and two torpedo bombers.) Lieutenant Vejtasa was awarded his third Navy Cross for this achievement. Seventy years later, an attempt to upgrade this to the Medal of Honor was denied. He is the only World War II carrier pilot awarded the Navy Cross "for both dive bombing and aerial combat."

He left Flying Squadron 10 in May 1943 and returned to the United States to serve as a flight instructor at Naval Air Station Atlantic City. He saw no further combat. At the end of the war, his tally was 10.25 victories, including a quarter shared credit for a Kawanishi H6K "Mavis" flying boat on 13 November 1942.

Post-war
Vejtasa remained in the Navy after the end of the war and served in the Korean War as air officer aboard   from 1951 to 1953. He commanded the ammunition ship  from July 1959 to August 1960 and the aircraft carrier  from November 1962 to November 1963. He received the Legion of Merit for his work as Commander Fleet Air, Miramar, from 15 August 1965 to 7 June 1968. He retired on 1 July 1970 as a captain.

Personal life
Vejtasa and his wife Irene had three children.

Vejtasa died on January 23, 2013. In accordance with his wishes, he was cremated and his ashes were scattered at sea.

Awards and decorations
He was also awarded two Bronze Stars, the Meritorious Service Medal and the Navy Commendation Medal and was inducted into the Carrier Aviation Hall of Fame in 1987.

1st Navy Cross citation

Lieutenant (junior grade) Stanley Winfield Vejtasa
U.S. Navy
Date Of Action: March 10, 1942
The President of the United States of America takes pleasure in presenting the Navy Cross to Lieutenant, Junior Grade Stanley Winfield Vejtasa, United States Navy, for extraordinary heroism in operations against the enemy while serving as Pilot of a carrier-based Navy Scouting Plane in Scouting Squadron FIVE (VS-5), attached to the U.S.S. YORKTOWN (CV-5), in action against enemy Japanese forces near Salamaua and Lae, New Guinea, on 10 March 1942. In the face of heavy anti-aircraft fire, Lieutenant, Junior Grade, Vejtasa dived and skillfully attacked one of three Japanese aircraft tenders or transports and obtained a direct hit on one of the hostile vessels. By his superb airmanship and outstanding courage he contributed to the destruction of the three enemy ships and upheld the highest traditions of the United States Naval Service.

2nd Navy Cross citation

Lieutenant (junior grade) Stanley Winfield Vejtasa
U.S. Navy
Date Of Action: May 4, 1942, May 7, 1942 and May 8, 1942
The President of the United States of America takes pleasure in presenting a Gold Star in lieu of a Second Award of the Navy Cross to Lieutenant, Junior Grade Stanley Winfield Vejtasa, United States Navy, for extraordinary heroism in operations against the enemy while serving as Pilot of a carrier-based Navy Scouting Plane in Scouting Squadron FIVE (VS-5), attached to the U.S.S. YORKTOWN (CV-5), in action against enemy Japanese forces at Tulagi Harbor on 4 May 1942, and in the Battle of the Coral Sea on 7 and 8 May 1942. On 4 May, Lieutenant, Junior Grade, Vejtasa participated in dive bombing attacks on the enemy in Tulagi Harbor which resulted in the sinking or damaging of at least eight enemy vessels. On 7 May, he took part in a dive bombing attack on an enemy carrier in the Coral Sea which resulted in the sinking of that vessel. On 8 May, while on anti-Torpedo Plane patrol, he engaged enemy bombing and Torpedo Planes heavily supported by fighters which attacked our forces. The attacks on 4 and 7 May were pressed home in the face of heavy anti-aircraft fire with no regard for personal safety. Lieutenant, Junior Grade, Vejtasa's conscientious devotion to duty and gallant self-command against formidable odds were in keeping with the highest traditions of the United States Naval Service.

3rd Navy Cross citation

Lieutenant Stanley Winfield Vejtasa
U.S. Navy
Date Of Action: October 26, 1942
The President of the United States of America takes pleasure in presenting a Second Gold Star in lieu of a Third Award of the Navy Cross to Lieutenant Stanley Winfield Vejtasa, United States Navy, for extraordinary heroism in operations against the enemy while serving as Pilot of a carrier-based Navy Fighter Plane and leader of a Combat Air patrol of four fighters of Fighting Squadron TEN (VF-10), attached to the U.S.S. ENTERPRISE (CV-6), during the engagement with enemy Japanese naval and air forces near the Santa Cruz Islands on 26 October 1942. As great numbers of enemy dive bombers and Torpedo Planes launched a vicious attack upon his carrier, Lieutenant Vejtasa unhesitatingly challenged and shot down two Japanese dive bombers and then gallantly led his patrol in an attack on a group of enemy Torpedo Planes with such daring aggressiveness that the formation was completely broken and three of the hostile bombers jettisoned their torpedoes as they fled. Lieutenant Vejtasa then personally shot down five of the remaining Japanese planes, making a total of seven enemy aircraft destroyed in a single flight. His superb airmanship and indomitable fighting spirit were in keeping with the highest traditions of the United States Naval Service.

On television
Vejtasa's exploits in the Battle of the Coral Sea are part of the television series Dogfights episode "Long Odds", and he described his actions in the Battle of the Santa Cruz Islands on the American documentary series Battle 360° episode "Bloody Santa Cruz".

References
Notes

Sources

Bibliography

External links
 15-part video interview of Vejtasa in the Digital Collections of The National WWII Museum
 2002 interview  for the Flying Heritage & Combat Armor Museum
 Remarks on tactics by Vejasa, "Voices of the Veterans", Air & Space/Smithsonian magazine, May 2015
 Navy Cross and Legion of Merit citations  at homeofheroes.com
 Detailed duty assignment chronology and awards at the Early and Pioneer Naval Aviators Association

1914 births
2013 deaths
United States Navy captains
United States Navy bomber pilots of World War II
United States Naval Aviators
American World War II flying aces
Recipients of the Navy Cross (United States)
Recipients of the Legion of Merit
Aviators from Montana
Montana State University alumni
University of Montana alumni
Recipients of the Meritorious Service Medal (United States)
Military personnel from Montana
United States Navy personnel of the Korean War
People from McCone County, Montana
Burials at sea
American people of Czech descent
American people of Norwegian descent